Footprints is a childcare and pre-school chain based in Gurgaon, India, founded in 2013 and operating on a franchising basis. The company was set up by Purvesh Sharma, Raj Singhal and Ashish Aggarwal, and raised over $2 million through angel investments and venture funding.

Footprints offers full-day daycare and pre-school facilities for children aged from three months to four years, following a curriculum developed by the HighScope Educational Research Foundation. The curriculum is age-specific, and divided into toddlers' (ages 9–18 months), playgroup (ages 19–30 months), pre-nursery (ages 31–42 months) and nursery (ages 42+ months) programmes.

Footprints operates facilities in Gurgaon, Noida, Delhi, Faridabad and Ghaziabad, employing an all-female staff, with an adult-to-infant ratio of 1:8.

Footprints have also developed a technology solution using Reado stick that provides pre-programmed voice output and acts as an automated teaching assistant.

References 

Schools in Gurgaon